Kale Kilit ve Kalıp Sanayi A.Ş. is a foundation of Kale Endüstri Holding.

History 

The company was founded by Sadık Özgür in 1953. Beginning as a small workshop at Tahtakale-İstanbul, Sadık Özgür carried out the "domestic manufacturing of the safety locks" in Turkey despite the challenging conditions in the country at that period.

The quality of products got accepted by the sector quickly and the growing demands encouraged new investments. In 1957 the workshop relocated to a bigger place at Bahçelievler/İstanbul and in 1958, renamed as Kale Kolektif Şirketi. Kale Kilit became the first company which exports safety locks in 1974 and expanded its export markets rapidly.

In 1979, with the direct proportion of increasing demand, a new production facility built at Güngören/Istanbul. This facility was the first integrated technological plant in Turkey. And in 1986, all the companies founded by Kale were collected under the umbrella of Kale Endüstri Holding A.Ş. Today, Kale Kilit is the leading manufacturer in Turkey with a production range of cylinders/barrels, safety lock, steel door locks, screws, safety catches and attachments.

Production 

Kale Kilit has integrated production facilities which have 35.000 m2 indoor area, 1630 workers and a production capacity of 100.000 safety locks and 50.000 barrels per day.

Exportation 

Expanding with exportation numbers Kale Kilit made more than half of the safety lock exportation of Turkey in 2005. And took the first place between 2006 and 2009 with the exportation numbers in the category of "metal property" in the chart of İstanbul Maden ve Metal İhracatçı Birlikleri (IMMIB) and won "The Star of Exportation Award".

With the %60 of safety lock exportation of Turkey per year, Kale Kilit exports its products to 75 countries on a regular basis. The Kale Kilit brand which has been exported to 102 countries until today is equipped in more than 100 million doors in the world.

Products 

Kale Kilit manufactures more than 350 product items under 9 product groups.

Lock manufacturers
Manufacturing companies based in Istanbul
Turkish brands